Kerry-Anne Saxby-Junna, born Kerry Saxby AM (born 2 June 1961) is a retired Australian race walker. She was born in Young, New South Wales  and grew up in Ballina, New South Wales.

She represented Australia 27 times in international competitions and set 32 world records or world bests. She won 27 Australian Championships and 13 individual international medals. She retired in 2001.

Recognition
Australian Institute of Sport (AIS) Athlete of the Year in 1986/87, 1987/1988, 1989 and in 2005 was inducted into the  AIS 'Best of the Best'.<ref>Australian Institute of Sport 'Best of the Best'  </</ref>
 Member of the Order of Australia (AM) in 1992 
 Australian Sports Medal in 2000
 Centenary Medal in 2001
 Athletics Australia Hall of Fame in 2013

Achievements

References

External links
 
 Kerry Saxby-Junna at Australian Athletics Historical Results
 
 
 
 

1961 births
Living people
Australian female racewalkers
Sportswomen from New South Wales
Olympic athletes of Australia
Athletes (track and field) at the 1992 Summer Olympics
Athletes (track and field) at the 1996 Summer Olympics
Athletes (track and field) at the 2000 Summer Olympics
Commonwealth Games medallists in athletics
Commonwealth Games gold medallists for Australia
Commonwealth Games silver medallists for Australia
Athletes (track and field) at the 1990 Commonwealth Games
Athletes (track and field) at the 1994 Commonwealth Games
Athletes (track and field) at the 1998 Commonwealth Games
World Athletics Championships medalists
World record setters in athletics (track and field)
Recipients of the Australian Sports Medal
Australian Institute of Sport track and field athletes
Members of the Order of Australia
People from Young, New South Wales
Goodwill Games medalists in athletics
World Athletics Indoor Championships winners
Competitors at the 1986 Goodwill Games
Competitors at the 1990 Goodwill Games
Medallists at the 1994 Commonwealth Games
Medallists at the 1998 Commonwealth Games